Ben Onono (sometime stylized as Ben OnOnO) is an Ivor Novello and Grammy nominated musician and songwriter. He is of British and Nigerian heritage. A scholar student at the Royal Academy of Music in London where he trained as a pianist.  In 2002 co-wrote the Ivor Novello award nominated worldwide hit single "It Just Won't Do" , with Tim DeLuxe.  His Top 5 hit song "Rainbow of Love" with Bob Sinclar was used in the 2011 Alfa Romeo advertising campaign. The track was the single for the Grammy nominated album Made in Jamaica with Sly and Robbie.  Ben Onono was the featured vocalist and writer of Saffron Hill's 2003 "My Love is Always", as well as the character in its music video. The song charted Top 20 in the UK National Charts.  His song "Fallen Hero" with NuFrequency remains the number 1 most charted song ever on the tastemaker website Resident Advisor.  Onono has written material for David Guetta, Cicada, Bob Sinclar, Fatboy Slim, Rui Da Silva, Futureshock, Natalie Imbruglia among others.

From his debut  Native Stranger, the track "Blink" was featured on the soundtrack for the TV series Long Way Down.  The entire album featured across the 6 part BBC series starring Ewan Macgreggor.   Also, from Native Stranger, the song "Count to 10" was used for the Netflix movie trailer of Special Correspondents starring Ricky Gervais.  His song "Never had a Dream Come True" was featured in the movie John Tucker Must Die, starring Jesse Metcalfe.  Other songs have featured in the USA TV series The Shield, Nip and Tuck, and Las Vegas.

Other film/TV credits include the adaptation of the award-winning Half of a Yellow Sun, starring Chiwetel Ejiofor and Thandiwe Newton, 2 series of the MTV Base award-winning series Shuga, and BBC 1 movie Danny and the Human Zoo.

Discography

Studio albums
2000: Badagry Beach
 Old Baggage
 Tattoo Blue
 On Common Ground
 Like Rain
 Simple Life
 Small World
 Badagry Beach
 Never Had a Dream Come True
 Word to the Wise
 Delilah (I Won't Chase Rainbows)
 Rewind Erase (4.14)
2008: Native Stranger
 Radio Silence
 Badagry Beach (6.18)
 Marvin's Groove
 Count to 10
 Day of Days
 Big Blue Moon
 Blink
 Raoul's Wager
 Caramel
 When the Moon Has Past
 Rewind Erase (4.12)

References

External links 
 Official page
 myspace profile
 Discogs entry
 1- https://web.archive.org/web/20130125033311/http://www.bobsinclar.com/uncategorized/to-all-grammys-members-vote-made-in-jamaica-for-a-grammy-nomination-in-the-reggae-category/

Musicians from Cardiff
British house musicians
British songwriters
Living people
Year of birth missing (living people)